Makhkety (Maxkathe)  is a rural locality (a selo) in Vedensky District, Chechnya.

Administrative and municipal status
Municipally, Makhkety is incorporated into Makhketinskoye rural settlement. It is the administrative center of the municipality and is the only settlement included in it.

Geography 

Makhkety is located between the Dzhalka and Tenek rivers.

The nearest settlements to Makhkety are Agishty in the north, Khattuni and Tevzana in the north-east, and Selmentauzen in the south-west.

Not far from the village, just across the border with Cheberloyevsky District is Barziarlam mountain.

Name 
The name "Makhkety" comes from the Chechen "мохк" meaning "land" or "homeland", and the ending "-тӀе", meaning "in" or "on". Therefore, the name of the village roughly translates as "settlement in the homeland".

History 
In 1944, after the genocide and deportation of the Chechen and Ingush people and the Chechen-Ingush ASSR was abolished, the village of Makhkety was renamed to Alak, and settled by people from the neighboring republic of Dagestan. From 1944 to 1957, it was a part of Grozny Oblast of the Russian SFSR.

In 1958, after the Vaynakh people returned and the Chechen-Ingush ASSR was restored, the village regained its old Chechen name, Makhkatye.

Population 
 1990 Census: 3,870
 2002 Census: 2,447
 2010 Census: 5,028
 2019 estimate: 5,400

According to the 2010 Census, the majority of residents of Makhkety were ethnic Chechens.

Infrastructure 
Makhkety has several important buildings. These include a rural mosque, a secondary school, and a museum on local lore.

References 

Rural localities in Vedensky District